The Minister of Works in New Zealand was a former cabinet member appointed by the Prime Minister to be in charge of the Ministry of Works and Development.

List of ministers
The following ministers held the office of Minister of Works.

Key

Notes

References

Works